The  is a national expressway in Ehime Prefecture, Japan. The expressway is numbered E11 between Kawanoe Junction and Matsuyama Interchange and E56 between Matsuyama and Uwajima-Kita Interchanges under the MLIT's "2016 Proposal for Realization of Expressway Numbering.

Overview 
The first section of the Matsuyama Expressway to open was between Zentsuji and Mishima-Kawanoe interchanges on 16 December 1987. The final section of the expressway (16.3 km between Seiyo-Uwa and Uwajima-Kita interchanges) was opened on 10 March 2012. The route between Ōzu and Ōzu-Kitatada interchanges are officially designated as the Ōzu Road, a bypass of National Route 56.

List of interchanges and features

 IC - interchange, SIC - smart interchange, JCT - junction, SA - service area, PA - parking area, BS - bus stop, TN - tunnel, TB - toll gate

The entire expressway is in Ehime Prefecture. The expressway is a direct extension of the Takamatsu Expressway.
{|table class="wikitable"
|-
!style="border-bottom:3px solid green;"|No.
!style="border-bottom:3px solid green;"|Name
!style="border-bottom:3px solid green;"|Connections
!style="border-bottom:3px solid green;"|Dist. fromOrigin
!style="border-bottom:3px solid green;"|Bus Stop
!style="border-bottom:3px solid green;"|Notes
!colspan="2" style="border-bottom:3px solid green;"|Location
|-
|colspan="8" style="text-align:center;"|Through to  Takamatsu Expressway 
|-
! style="background:#bfb;"|6
|Kawanoe JCT
| Takamatsu Expressway Kōchi Expressway
|style="text-align:right;"|56.8
|style="text-align:center;"|
|
|rowspan="5"|Shikokuchūō
|-
! style="background:#bfb;"|PA
|Kamibun PA
|
|style="text-align:right;"|59.0
|style="text-align:center;"|
|
|-
! style="background:#bfb;"|7
|Mishima-Kawanoe IC
| National Route 11 (Kawanoe-Mishima Bypass)Pref. Route 333 (Mishima-Kawanoe Port Route) 
|style="text-align:right;"|60.0
|style="text-align:center;"|○
|
|-
! style="background:#bfb;"|8
|Doi IC
| National Route 11Pref. Route 13 (Nyūgawa Niihama Noda Route) 
|style="text-align:right;"|71.0
|style="text-align:center;"|
|
|-
! style="background:#bfb;"|PA
|Irino PA
|
|style="text-align:right;"|74.9
|style="text-align:center;"|
|
|-
! style="background:#bfb;"|9
|Niihama IC
|Pref. Route 47 (Niihama Besshiyama Route) 
|style="text-align:right;"|84.3
|style="text-align:center;"|
|
|Niihama
|-
! style="background:#bfb;"|10
|Iyo-Saijō IC
| National Route 11 
|style="text-align:right;"|93.1
|style="text-align:center;"|
|
|rowspan="4"|Saijō
|-
!style="background-color:#BFB;"|SA
|Ishizuchiyama SA
|
|style="text-align: right;"|106.8
|style="text-align: center;"|◆
|Known otherwise as “Michinoeki Komatsu Oasis”
|-
!rowspan="2" style="background-color: #BFB;"|11
|Iyo-Komatsu JCT
| Imabari-Komatsu Expressway
|rowspan="2" style="text-align:right; "|108.6
|style="text-align:center;"|
|
|-
|Iyo-Komatsu IC
| National Route 11
|
|
|-
!style="background-color:#BFB;"|PA
|Sakurasanri PA
|
|style="text-align: right;"|126.0
|style="text-align: center;"|
|
|rowspan="3"|Tōon
|-
!style="background:#bfb;"|12
|Kawauchi IC
| National Route 11
|style="text-align:right;"|130.0
|style="text-align:center;"|○
|
|-
!style="background-color:#BFB;"|
|style="background-color:#ffdead;"|Tōon SIC
|style="background-color:#ffdead;"|
|style="background-color:#ffdead; text-align:right;"|
|style="background-color:#ffdead; text-align:center;"|
|style="background-color:#ffdead;"|Expected to open in 2023
|-
!style="background:#bfb;"|13
|Matsuyama IC
| National Route 33Matsuyama Soto Kanjō RoadPref. Route 190 (Kume Habu Route) 
|style="text-align:right;"|141.9
|style="text-align:center;"|
|
|Matsuyama
|-
!style="background-color:#BFB;"|SA
|Iyo-nada SA
|
|style="text-align:right;"|145.5145.8
|style="text-align:center;"|
|Uwajima-boundKawanoe-bound
|rowspan="3"|Iyo
|-
!style="background:#bfb;"|14
|Iyo IC
| National Route 56
|style="text-align:right;"|151.9
|style="text-align:center;"|
|
|-
!style="background-color:#BFB;"|
|style="background-color:#ffdead;"|Nakayama SIC
|style="background-color:#ffdead;"|
|style="background-color:#ffdead; text-align:right;"|159.7
|style="background-color:#ffdead; text-align:center;"|
|style="background-color:#ffdead;"|Expected to open in 2023
|-
!style="background-color:#BFB;"|PA
|Uchiko PA
|
|style="text-align:right;"|172.7172.9
|style="text-align:center;"|
|Kawanoe-boundUwajima-bound
|rowspan="2"|Uchiko
|-
!style="background:#bfb;"|15
|Uchiko-Ikazaki IC
| National Route 56
|style="text-align:right;"|175.9
|style="text-align:center;"|
|
|-
!style="background-color: #BFB;"|TB
|Ōzu TB
|style="background-color:#dcdcfe;"|
|style="background-color:#dcdcfe; text-align:right; "|182.3
|style="background-color:#dcdcfe;"|
|style="background-color:#dcdcfe;"|
|rowspan="8"|Ōzu
|-
! style="background:#bfb;"|16
|Ōzu IC
|style="background-color:#ffdddd;"| National Route 56 (Ōzu Road)
|style="background-color:#ffdddd; text-align:right;"|183.2
|style="background-color:#ffdddd; text-align:center;"|
|style="background-color:#ffdddd;"|Uwajima-bound exit, Matsuyama-bound entrance only
|-
! style="background:#bfb;"|17
|Ōzu-Kita IC
|style="background-color:#ffdddd;"| National Route 56 
|style="background-color:#ffdddd; text-align:right;"|184.9
|style="background-color:#ffdddd; text-align:center;"|
|style="background-color:#ffdddd;"|Matsuyama-bound exit, Uwajima-bound entrance only
|-
! style="background:#bfb;"|18
|Ōzu-Fuji IC
| National Route 197 
|style="text-align:right;"|186.4
|style="text-align:center;"|
|
|-
! style="background:#bfb;"|19
|Ōzu-kōnan IC
|Pref. Route 44 (Ōzu Nomura Route)
|style="text-align:right;"|188.7
|style="text-align:center;"|
|
|-
! style="background:#bfb;"|20
|Ōzu-Minami IC
|style="background-color:#ffdddd;"| National Route 56 
|style="background-color:#ffdddd; text-align:right;"|189.4
|style="background-color:#ffdddd; text-align:center;"|
|style="background-color:#ffdddd;"|Uwajima-bound exit, Matsuyama-bound entrance only
|-
! style="background:#bfb;"|21
|Ōzu-Kitatada IC
|style="background-color:#ffdddd;"|  Ōzu-Yawatahama Road (planned) National Route 197 
|style="background-color:#ffdddd; text-align:right;"|190.8
|style="background-color:#ffdddd; text-align:center;"|
|style="background-color:#ffdddd;"|Matsuyama-bound exit, Uwajima-bound entrance only
|-
!style="background-color: #BFB;"|TB
|Ōzu-Matsuo TB
|style="background-color:#dcdcfe;"|
|style="background-color:#dcdcfe; text-align:right; "|193.1
|style="background-color:#dcdcfe;"|
|style="background-color:#dcdcfe;"|
|-
! style="background:#bfb;"|22
|Seiyo-Uwa IC
|Pref. Route 29 (Uwa Nomura Route)Pref. Route 45 (Uwa Akehama Route)
|style="text-align:right;"|206.0
|style="text-align:center;"|
|
|Seiyo
|-
! style="background:#bfb;"|23
|Mima IC
|Pref. Route 31 (Uwa Mima Route)Pref. Route 283 (Hiromi Yoshida Route)
|style="text-align:right;"|216.9
|style="text-align:center;"|
|
|rowspan="2"|Uwajima
|-
! style="background:#bfb;"|
|Uwajima-Kita IC
| National Route 56 
|style="text-align:right;"|222.3
|style="text-align:center;"|
|
|-
|colspan="8" style="text-align:center;"|Through to   Uwajima Road

References

External links 
 West Nippon Expressway Company

Expressways in Japan
Ehime Prefecture